Jorge Santibáñez Ceardi (1 March 1934 – 30 July 2020) was a Chilean politician and lawyer.

Santibáñez Ceardi was born on 1 March 1934 in Santiago to Chilean Navy admiral Julio Santibáñez Escobar and his wife Adriana Ceardi Ferrer. Santibáñez Ceardi began practicing law in 1958.

His political career began in 1960 with a stint as alderman in Viña del Mar, as a member of the Christian Democratic Party. He ran for the Valparaíso Region seat on the Chamber of Deputies in 1965, and remained in office until 15 May 1973. His affiliation with the Christian Democratic Party ended after the 1973 Chilean coup d'état, which he endorsed. He returned to the city council of Viña del Mar in 1992, and served as mayor of the city from 1994 to 1996, while a member of the Union of the Centrist Center. Santibáñez Ceardi ended his political career as a member of the National Renewal party, stepping down from the municipal council in 2000. 

Santibáñez Ceardi died at the age of 86 on 30 July 2020.

References

1934 births
2020 deaths
Politicians from Santiago
Chilean people of Spanish descent
Christian Democratic Party (Chile) politicians
Union of the Centrist Center politicians
National Renewal (Chile) politicians
Deputies of the XLV Legislative Period of the National Congress of Chile
Deputies of the XLVI Legislative Period of the National Congress of Chile
Mayors of Viña del Mar
Municipal councillors of Viña del Mar
20th-century Chilean lawyers
Pontifical Catholic University of Valparaíso alumni